The Chief of Policy and Plans Department (C LEDS INRI) is the head of the Policy and Plans Department in the Defence Staff at the Swedish Armed Forces Headquarters. The Chief of Policy and Plans Department is part of the Defence Board (Försvarsmaktsledningen, FML), a group of the Supreme Commander's top commanders.

Responsibilities
The Chief of Policy and Plans Department leads and develops the military strategic operations command. The task includes leading the work with defence planning, evaluating the rapid reaction organisation's (insatsorganisation) capabilities, evaluating developments abroad and proposing any activation of relevant parts of the defence plan or other emergency measures, and preparing the Supreme Commander of the Swedish Armed Forces's decision, and on behalf of the Chief of Defence Staff, deciding supplementary orders to FMO and directives within the Swedish Armed Forces Headquarters for the implementation of defence operations and operations.

The chief also prepares the Swedish Armed Forces' focus on intelligence and the security service (Försvarsmaktens inriktning av underrättelse och säkerhetstjänsten, FMInriUS). The Chief of Policy and Plans Department leads the Swedish Armed Forces' capability development. The task includes leading the preparation of the Swedish Armed Forces' Strategic Orientation (Försvarsmaktens Strategiska Inriktning, FMSI) and proposing long-term goals and requirements for operations, organization and products in all areas of activity. It also includes leading the preparation of the Swedish Armed Forces 'doctrines, leading the Swedish Armed Forces' research and technology development, studies and concept development, and leading operational demands on the war organization. The task also includes preparing the direction of the Swedish Armed Forces' cooperation with other states and international organizations, as well as the direction of defence attachés regarding bilateral relations and cooperation.

Duties
The Chief of Policy and Plans Department shall support the Chief Financial Officer with requirements for equipment and logistics supply, and in the preparation of the early phases of investment planning with documentation from research and development assignments and studies. The Chief of Policy and Plans Department decides on directives at the Swedish Armed Forces Headquarters within the framework of defence planning, the Swedish Armed Forces' study and concept development plan, the Swedish Armed Forces' plan for group-wide research and development, including the focus of strategic collaborations, and the Swedish Armed Forces' strategy and focus plan for research and technology development.

The Chief of Policy and Plans Department is authorized to, within the framework of the tasks in § 41 and § 42 of FIB 2020:5 and assignments from the Supreme Commander of the Swedish Armed Forces and directives from the Chief of Defence Staff, enter into agreements and contracts with authorities, municipalities, regions, organizations and individuals.

Chiefs of Policy and Plans Department

Deputy Chiefs of Policy and Plans Department

References

Military appointments of Sweden